Tarnaörs is a village (község) in Heves County, Northern Hungary Region, Hungary. Baroness Orczy, the author of The Scarlet Pimpernel, was born here.

References

 
Populated places in Heves County